Robert Lynn Parker (September 24, 1960 – April 20, 2021) was a college track and field coach for the throwing events at Texas A&M University and University of Texas at El Paso. He coached several NCAA champions, but was most recognized for coaching world record holder in the shot put, Randy Barnes.

Biography
Parker was born in Wharton, Texas to Arnold Oliver Parker and Carmella Parker. Being an active track and field athlete he attended South Plains junior college in Levelland, Texas. He made All American honors in both javelin and decathlon. He then sought his Bachelor of Arts and Science from Angelo State University (ASU). He graduated from ASU in 1983 with the school record in the javelin. A sports injury stopped his athletic career, and the following year Parker began his coaching and teaching career at Paris High School.

In 1985 Parker moved to College Station, Texas to pursue his Master of Education at Texas A&M. While there he was graduate assistant on the Aggies Track and Field team. Head coach Ted Nelson hired Parker as a full time assistant coach for the field events in 1987.

Parker lived in Argyle in Denton County, married to Traci (nee Stevenson) and was the father of Tommy Parker, a two time state High School champion golfer.

He retired from teaching and coaching in 2000. He then moved into a new career as a financial advisor where he over the coming years worked with such companies as Merrill Lynch, Smith Barney, UBS and Wells Fargo.

Coaching career

Texas A&M Aggies
In his four years as coach for the Aggies, Parker coached Olympic champions Mike Stulce and Randy Barnes. The highlights of those years were Barnes' world records.

Sports Illustrated reported from Drake Stadium after the record toss:

Parker's coaching at Texas A&M led to 20 conference champions; 14 All-Americans; and a number of school and conference record-holders. Five of the shot putters under Parker's coaching are ranked in the Top 12 all-time at Texas A&M, along with 3 discus throwers, 2 javelin throwers, and 4 combined event athletes, as of April 2021.

UTEP Miners
In 1991 Parker started teaching and coaching at Highland Park High School in University Park, Texas. In the fall of 1993 Parker was hired as the assistant coach for the UTEP Miners in El Paso. There he coached Norwegian four time shot put-champion Kjell Ove Hauge to runner up at 1994 NCAA Championships, at Boise, Idaho, passing the  limit for the first time with 20.07. At the same championships Parker also coached Greek hammer thrower Alexandros Papadimitriou to second place. Parker's two athletes scored 16 of the 45 total points for UTEP to place the team 2nd. As of 2020 it is still UTEP's best achievement at the NCAA Championships since the school's glory days in the 1970s and 80s.

Parker left El Paso after one year and went back to Dallas as a High School educator and coach at Flower Mound High School. He stayed on as Hauge's coach until 1998.

References

External links  
 Track and Field News, 1 March 1989 T&FN, Interview Randy Barnes

1960 births
2021 deaths
American investment advisors
American male decathletes
American male javelin throwers
American track and field coaches
Texas A&M Aggies track and field coaches
UTEP Miners track and field coaches
Angelo State University alumni
Texas A&M University alumni
Track and field athletes from Texas
People from Denton County, Texas
People from Wharton County, Texas